Elks is an unincorporated community in Lafayette Parish, Louisiana, United States.

The community is located near the intersection of US 90  and East Verot School Road.

References

Unincorporated communities in Louisiana
Unincorporated communities in Lafayette Parish, Louisiana
Acadiana